The Northeastern Huskies represented Northeastern University in the Women's Hockey East Association during the 2014–15 NCAA Division I women's ice hockey season. The Huskies advanced as far as the WHEA Semifinal game before falling to nationally ranked Boston University.

Offseason
June 25: Kelly Wallace earned the nod as the Hockey East nominee for the 2014 NCAA Woman of the Year award. Leading the Huskies in 2013-14 with 19 goals and 32 points, she was the runner-up for the Hockey East Player of the Year.
July 21: Former Huskies goaltender Katy Augustyn was named to the United States roster competing at the IRB Women's Rugby World Cup in France. She competed with the Huskies from 2002–06, accumulating three shutouts.
August 5: Three members of the Huskies roster, Kendall Coyne, Paige Savage and Heather Mottau, earned invitations to the 2014 USA Hockey Women's National Festival.

Recruiting

Roster

2014–15 Huskies

Schedule

|-
!colspan=12 style=""| Regular Season

|-
!colspan=12 style=""| WHEA Tournament

Awards and honors
 Kendall Coyne led the WHEA in goals scored (21) and placed second in points (39).
 Kendall Coyne was named a first team WHEA All-Star
 Denisa Křížová was named to the Pro Ambitions All-Rookie team.

References

Northeastern
Northeastern Huskies women's ice hockey seasons